Christopher G. Chute is a Bloomberg Distinguished Professor at Johns Hopkins University, physician-scientist and biomedical informatician known for biomedical terminologies  and health information technology (IT) standards. He chairs the World Health Organization Revision Steering Group for the revision of the International Classification of Diseases (ICD-11).

Biography
Chute received his undergraduate and medical training at Brown University, internal medicine residency at Dartmouth, and doctoral training in Epidemiology at Harvard.  He is Board certified in Internal Medicine and Clinical Informatics.  He is a Fellow of the American College of Physicians, the American College of Epidemiology, and the American College of Medical Informatics (ACMI).  Chute is president of ACMI, a body of elected fellows within the American Medical Informatics Association (AMIA) who have made significant and sustained contributions to the field.

Since January 2015 Chute is the Bloomberg Distinguished Professor in Health Informatics at the Johns Hopkins University, with academic appointments in the School of Medicine (Division of General Internal Medicine & Division of Health Sciences Informatics), Bloomberg School of Public Health (Department of Health Policy and Management), and School of Nursing (Division of Health Informatics).  He is also Chief Research Information Officer of Johns Hopkins Medicine.

In December 2014 Chute retired from Mayo Clinic, where he remains an emeritus professor.  He became founding Chair of Biomedical Informatics at Mayo Clinic in 1988, stepping down after 20 years in that role.  At Mayo Clinic he was Professor of Medical Informatics and Section Head.  He was PI on a large portfolio of research including the HHS/Office of the National Coordinator (ONC) Strategic Health IT Advanced Research Projects on Secondary EHR Data Use, the ONC Beacon Community (Co-PI), the LexGrid projects, Mayo’s Clinical and Translational Science Award Informatics, and several National Institutes of Health (NIH) grants including one of the eMERGE centers  from the National Human Genome Research Institute (NHGRI), which focus upon genome wide association studies against shared phenotypes derived from electronic medical records.  Chute served as Chair of the Mayo Clinic Data Governance Committee, and on Mayo’s enterprise IT Oversight Committee.  He was Chair of the International Organization for Standardization (ISO) Health Informatics Technical Committee (ISO/TC 215).  He also served on the Health Information Technology Standards Committee for the Office of the National Coordinator   in the United States Department of Health and Human Services, and the Health Level 7 Advisory Council.  Recently held positions include Chair of the Biomedical Computing and Health Informatics study section at NIH, Chair of the Board of the HL7/FDA/NCI/CDISC BRIDG project, on the Board of the Clinical Data Interchange Standards Consortium, ANSI Healthcare Information Technology Standards Panel Board member, Chair of the US delegation to ISO TC215 for Health Informatics, Convener of Healthcare Concept Representation WG3 within the TC215, Co-chair of the HL7 Vocabulary Committee, Chair of the International Medical Informatics Association WG6 on Medical Concept Representation, American Medical Informatics Association Board member, and multiple other NIH biomedical informatics study sections as chair or member.

Awards 
 1987 Elected Fellow, American College of Epidemiology
1988 Elected Fellow, American College of Physicians
1995 Elected Fellow, American College of Medical Informatics
2002 President's Award, American Medical Informatics Association
2005 IBM Faculty Award
2015-2020 President, American College of Medical Informatics
2017 Inaugural Fellow, International Academy of Health Sciences Informatics
2017 Elected Fellow, Health Level Seven International (HL7)

Publications
Chute has more than 31,000 citations in Google Scholar and an h-index of 83.
 PubMed Citations
 Google Scholar Citations
Highly Cited Articles (more than 1000 citations)

 1993 with JE Oesterling, SJ Jacobsen, HA Guess, CJ Girman, LA Panser, MM Lieber, Serum prostate-specific antigen in a community-based population of healthy men: establishment of age-specific reference ranges, in: JAMA. Vol. 270, nº 7; 860-864.
 2010 with GK Savova, JJ Masanz, PV Ogren, J Zheng, S Sohn, KC Kipper-Schuler, Mayo clinical Text Analysis and Knowledge Extraction System (cTAKES): architecture, component evaluation and applications, in: Journal of the American Medical Informatics Association. Vol. 17, nº 5; 507-513.
 1995 with E Giovannucci, KM Egan, DJ Hunter, MJ Stampfer, GA Colditz, WC Willett, FE Speizer, Aspirin and the risk of colorectal cancer in women, in: New England Journal of Medicine. Vol. 333, nº 10; 609-614.
 1993 with E Giovannucci, EB Rimm, GA Colditz, MJ Stampfer, A Ascherio, WC Willett, A prospective study of dietary fat and risk of prostate cancer, in: JNCI: Journal of the National Cancer Institute. Vol. 85, nº 19; 1571-1579.

References 

Living people
Health informaticians
Brown University alumni
Harvard School of Public Health alumni
Alpert Medical School alumni
1955 births